The Croatia national youth handball team is the national under–18 handball team of Croatia. Controlled by the Croatian Handball Federation, it represents Croatia in international matches.

Statistics

World Championship record

References

External links
World Men's Youth Championship table
European Men's Youth Championship table

 

Handball in Croatia
Men's national youth handball teams
Handball